The Albany FireWolves are a lacrosse team based in Albany, New York playing in the National Lacrosse League (NLL). The 2023 season is the franchise's 7th season in the league, 2nd as the Albany FireWolves. 

A month before the season started, the team announced that George Manias resigned as team president. Chris Porreca, who was previously Vice President of Corporate Sales & Business Operations has taken over the position of president.

Regular season

Current standings

Game log

Roster

Entry Draft
The 2022 NLL Entry Draft took place on September 10, 2022. The FireWolves made the following selections:

References

Albany FireWolves

Albany FireWolves seasons

}}